Merrie Ruth Amsterburg (born in March 1960) is an American singer-songwriter born in Ludington, Michigan, United States. Her music has folk, rock, and pop influences. She has won two Boston Music Awards, a Boston Phoenix Award, and a Jam Magazine Award. She uses several instruments in her songs, including the guitar, the trumpet, the mandolin, the Indian banjo, the bouzouki, the harmonium, and even a 1970s Kenmore washing machine. Prior to her solo career, she was the guitarist and singer for The Natives and Miss Understood.

On July 5, 2002, she sang the National Anthem at the Red Sox's first game after the death of Red Sox and baseball legend Ted Williams, who had died that morning.

Discography
Season of Rain (1996)
World of Our Own Making (1999) (EP)
Season of Rain reissue (1999)
Little Steps (2000)
Clementine and Other Stories (2006)

References

External links
Official website
Article on Merrie Amsterburg in the Noise

American women singer-songwriters
American rock guitarists
American women rock singers
American rock songwriters
Living people
Zoë Records artists
People from Ludington, Michigan
Singer-songwriters from Michigan
Guitarists from Michigan
21st-century American women singers
21st-century American singers
1960 births